Gert Haucke (1929–2008) was a German film and television actor.

Partial filmography

 Rumpelstilzchen (1960) as Haushofmeister
 Das Glück läuft hinterher (1963) as Bedeutender Mann
  (1966), as Arthur
  (1968, TV miniseries), as William Brother
 Death in the Red Jaguar (1968), as Kit Davis
 Der Kommissar: Lisa Bassenges Mörder (1971, TV series episode), as Herr Fechtner
 Ludwig: Requiem for a Virgin King (1972), as Baron Freyschlag
 The Stuff That Dreams Are Made Of (1972), as Zuhälter Karl Concon
  (1973, TV miniseries), as Emil Manzow
 Tatort: Kressin und die zwei Damen aus Jade (1973, TV series episode), as Göbel
  (1974), as Oberverwalter Engelweich
  (1974), as Schlachter-Karl
 Der kleine Doktor: Ein Holländer in Paris (1974, TV series episode), as Kees van der Donck
 Krankensaal 6 (1974), as Sergejytsch
 Assassination in Davos (1974), as Wilhelm Gustloff
 Tadellöser & Wolff (1975, TV miniseries), as Dr. Fink
  (1975), as Schöffe Vater
 Derrick: Alarm auf Revier 12 (1975, TV series episode), as Ross
 Auf Biegen oder Brechen (1975)
 A Lost Life (1976), as Kommissar Weber
 The Old Fox: Die Dienstreise (1977, TV series episode), as Rudi Stallmann
  (1978, TV series), as Dienstmann Kiesow
 Der Geist der Mirabelle (1978, TV film), as Kallesen
  (1980, TV film), as Standartenführer
  (1981, TV film), as Jean Quirin de Forcade
 Wir (1982, TV film) (based on We, the 1921 Russian novel by Yevgeny Zamyatin), as S-4710
 Bananen-Paul (1982), as Oppositionsführer
 The Old Fox: Teufelsküche (1982, TV series episode), as Werner Prott
  (1983, TV film), as Prof. Mühlheim
 Die Supernasen (1983), as Direktor Heinrich Sasse
  (1984), as Herr Hillermann
  (1985), as Hauswirt
 Seitenstechen (1985), as Mr. Böhm
  (1986), as Grueter
 Der Landarzt (1987–2004, TV series, 110 episodes), as Bruno Hanusch (final appearance)
  (1988), as Professor Alois Schönberg
  (1988), as Vater Kranich
 Adrian und die Römer (1989), as Heinz Schikaneder
 Derrick: Wie kriegen wir Bodetzki? (1989, TV series episode), as Bodetzki
 Ein Fall für zwei: Zyankali (1989, TV series episode), as Fackelmann
 The Man Inside (1990), as Heinz Herbert Schultz
  (1991, TV film), as Alfons Lappas
 Ein Fall für zwei: Tod frei Haus (1991, TV series episode), as Dr. Hanstädter
 Der König von Dulsberg (1994, TV film), as Berger
 : Inkasso (1994, TV series episode), as Gustav Schweiger
 Tatort: : Tödliche Freundschaft (1995, TV series episode), as Nowak
 Ein Fall für zwei: Miese Tricks (1996, TV series episode), as Wolfgang Preute
  (1995), as Brüderle
 Diebinnen (1996)
 Rosa Roth: Nirgendwohin (1996, TV series episode), as Kasunke
 Großstadtrevier: Brennende Probleme (1997, TV series episode), as Jakob Meier
 Der Ermittler (2001–2002, TV series, 2 episodes), as Dr. Tschupka

References

External links

1929 births
2008 deaths
Male actors from Berlin
German male film actors
German male television actors
20th-century German male actors
Rundfunk im amerikanischen Sektor people